Venger may refer to:
 The Venger: Dead Man Rising, an American comic book series by Matthew Spatola
 Venger, a character in Dungeons & Dragons

People with the surname
 Anders Venger (1872–1935), Norwegian politician of the Conservative Party
 Amund Venger (1943–2013), Norwegian politician for the Centre Party